Sodankylä Airfield is an airfield in Sodankylä, Lapland, Finland, located  south-east of Sodankylä municipal centre.

The airfield was originally built in the early 1940s, initially as a stopover airfield for the flights to Petsamo. A  gravel runway was built in 1971. The asphalt pavement and terminal building were completed in 1989, and there were scheduled flights in 1989–1996. There were some plans to build a new, longer runway to enable direct charter flights in the early 2000s. Sodankylä Airport was turned to an uncontrolled airfield on July 1, 2010. Today the airfield serves as a general aviation airfield.

See also
List of airports in Finland

References

External links
  
 Lentopaikat.fi – Sodankylä Airfield

Airports in Finland
Airfield